Norman Elmer May (19 May 1917 – 28 June 1993) was a Canadian wrestler. He competed in the men's freestyle bantamweight at the 1948 Summer Olympics.

References

External links
 

1917 births
1993 deaths
Canadian male sport wrestlers
Olympic wrestlers of Canada
Wrestlers at the 1948 Summer Olympics
Place of birth missing